The Grand Prix de Villers-Cotterêts was a single-day road bicycle race held annually in the commune of Villers-Cotterêts, France from 1998 until 2008. In 2005 and 2006, the race was organized as a 1.1 event on the UCI Europe Tour, and was also part of the Coupe de France de cyclisme sur route. In 2007 the race did not take place.

Winners 

 
 
 

UCI Europe Tour races
Recurring sporting events established in 1998
1998 establishments in France
Cycle races in France
Defunct cycling races in France
Recurring sporting events disestablished in 2006
2006 disestablishments in France
Sport in Aisne